The Independents is a 2018 American musical comedy-drama film written and directed by Greg Naughton, who stars alongside Rich Price and Brian Chartrand. The film is loosely based on the formation of the trio's real-life band, The Sweet Remains. It premiered at the Santa Barbara International Film Festival in February 2018, and was released three years later on February 26, 2021.

Premise 
Three down-on-their luck musicians form a group and begin touring for a one last shot at fame.

Cast
 Rich Price as Rich
 Greg Naughton as Greg
 Brian Chartrand as Brian
 Boyd Gaines as Professor Green
 Kelli O'Hara as Kelly
 James Naughton as Officer Sanders
 Richard Kind as Granny

Release
The film premiered at the Santa Barbara International Film Festival on February 6, 2018. It also screened at the DeadCENTER Film Festival on June 7, 2018, and the Mill Valley Film Festival on October 5, 2018. It was released digitally on February 26, 2021, by Giant Pictures.

Reception

Stephen Farber of The Hollywood Reporter gave the film a positive review and wrote, "The songs are smoothly integrated into the story, but the film's main virtue is the warmth it shows toward the three main characters and their sometimes desperate dreams."

References

External links
 
 
 

2018 films
2018 comedy-drama films
2010s musical comedy-drama films
American musical comedy-drama films
Films about musical groups
2010s English-language films
2010s American films